The Takkar massacre was a massacre of non-violent Pashtun protesters committed by the British Indian Army in Mardan, British India on 28 May 1930, just a month after the Qissa Khwani massacre in Peshawar.

The firing happened at Takkar in Mardan Tehsil when local villagers attempted to stop soldiers from arresting activists of the Khudai Khidmatgar movement. In the ensuing shooting an English police officer called Murphy was killed. Three days later, a large force of troops attacked the village in retaliation. Takkar was immortalised and folksongs were written to remember the tragedy. "Pa Takkar jang de golay warege," is still a popular and sorrowful folksong that depicted the village scene on the day of the British offensive on Takkar. According to the Pashto book Da Khpal Waakaye Tarun, 70 people were killed and 150 wounded in the massacre. A monument has been built in order to preserve the memories of those who died in the massacre. Some of the dead were identified as Juma Syed, Sanobar Kaka, Said Buland Kaka, Zarawar Khan and Baghi Shah.

This was followed by the 24 August 1930 Spin Tangi massacre in Bannu.

See also
Babrra massacre
Kharqamar incident
Qissa Khwani Bazaar massacre
Spin Tangi massacre

References
3.   Pa Takkar Jung de by Suhaib Haider Takkar ( May 28, 2017 ) The Daily Ajj.

May 1930 events
Massacres in 1930
Pakistan Movement
Indian independence movement
History of Khyber Pakhtunkhwa
Mardan District
1930 in India
Conflicts in 1930
1930s in British India
Massacres committed by the United Kingdom
Massacres in British India